IV is the fourth studio album from Canadian jazz instrumental hip hop band BadBadNotGood. It was released on July 8, 2016. It features collaborations with Future Islands frontman Sam Herring, saxophonist Colin Stetson, Haitian-Canadian musician Kaytranada, American hip hop artist Mick Jenkins, and Canadian singer-songwriter Charlotte Day Wilson.

It is also the band's first album to feature longtime touring partner and collaborator Leland Whitty as a formal member of the band.

Background and recording

In an interview with Howl & Echoes, the band described IV'''s conception and recording process: 

With the album's cover art, Katie Hawthorne of The Skinny said: "Every single instrument used is listed with pride on the record's cover, and the [band] stand chests bare, towels around waists, bro-ing out."

Critical receptionIV received favorable reviews from contemporary music critics. At Metacritic, which assigns a normalized rating out of 100 to reviews from mainstream critics, the album received an average score of 77, based on 16 reviews, which indicates "generally favorable reviews".

Mackenzie Herd of Exclaim! praised the album, stating, "Each song possesses rhythmic and melodically intricate properties that sound somehow both rehearsed and spontaneous. So, while IV is extraordinary for delivering fresh music that elaborates on their past work, it feels particularly exceptional because of its forward momentum." Paul Simpson of AllMusic gave the album a favorable review, stating, "It's easy to see why BBNG are the type of jazz group that appeals to people who normally don't care for jazz. They're music lovers, first and foremost, and they're directly in tune with what's happening in the music world. They blend numerous influences and don't conform to any traditions. More than anything, their music is exuberant and immensely enjoyable." Carl Purvis of No Ripcord praised the vocals of Herring and Wilson, concluding that: "BBNG have always been fluent and sonically articulate, but enlisting the talents of suitable vocalists to thicken their smokescreen strengthens their suit."

Jamie Milton of DIY was more critical of the album, stating, "There’s not a great deal tying these songs together, aside from BBNG’s pursuit of the new. Collaborations aren’t here to generate headlines or set pulses racing - each serves its own noble purpose. Taken on their own, each track solidifies the group’s wild imagination, but IV'' is tough to stomach as the free-flowing, full-bodied juggernaut that it is."

Accolades

Track listing

Personnel

Credits adapted from the album's liner notes.
BadBadNotGood
Matthew Tavares – piano (1, 4, 7, 11), Rhodes (2, 8, 9, 10), CS-60 (1, 9), crumar (3, 10), bass guitar (1), drum machine (1), Polysix (2), auxiliary synthesizer (5), Juno-60 (6); engineer, mixing
Chester Hansen – bass guitar (1-8, 10, 11), CS-60 (4-6, 8), piano and crumar (2), Yamaha organ (5), acoustic bass (9)
Alexander Sowinski – drums, percussion (1, 4-6, 11), vibraphone (10)
Leland Whitty – electric guitar (3, 5, 8, 10), acoustic guitar (5, 10), tenor saxophone (1, 2, 4, 6, 7, 11), flute (1, 2, 6, 10, 11), bass clarinet (1, 6), soprano saxophone (1, 6), violin (10, 11), CS-60 (1), clarinet (1), vibraphone (1), alto saxophone (2)

Additional contributors
Colin Stetson – bass saxophone (4), tenor saxophone (4)
Kaytranada – CS-60 (5), percussion (5)
Tom Moffat – trumpet and trombone (11)
Sam Herring – vocals (3)
Mick Jenkins – vocals (8)
Charlotte Day Wilson – vocals (10)
Stephen Koszler – mixing
João Carvalho – mastering

Charts

References

External links
 

2016 albums
BadBadNotGood albums
Innovative Leisure albums
Electronica albums by Canadian artists
Rhythm and blues albums by Canadian artists
Lounge music albums